Myeongnim Eosu (명림어수, 明臨於漱) (?-254) was the prime minister of Goguryeo during the reigns of Kings Dongcheon and Jungcheon.

Background
Myeongnim Eosu was a member of the Yeonna-Bu Myeongnim House, and possibly related to Myeongnim Dap-bu, the first prime minister of Goguryeo. Myeongnim Eosu is recorded to have served in the government with the position of Wutae before he became prime minister of Goguryeo.

Prime minister

Reign of King Dongcheon
In the year 230, during the 4th year of the reign of King Dongcheon, prime minister of Goguryeo Go Uru died, and Myeongnim Eosu rose to the position of prime minister. He assisted the King in the Goguryeo-Wei Wars.

Reign of King Jungcheon
Go Yeon-bul, the son of King Dongcheon, became the 12th ruler of Goguryeo in the year 248, after the death of his father. The prime minister at this time was still Myeongnim Eosu. The new king gave the prime minister responsibilities over military affairs in 250. In 254, Prime Minister Myeongnim Eosu died of unknown causes and was replaced by Eum-u, a Biryu-Bu noble.

See also
 Three Kingdoms of Korea
 Goguryeo

Sources
 Samguk Sagi, Goguryeo Bon-gi

References 

Goguryeo
History of Korea
3rd-century heads of government
Goguryeo people